Nissim Kahlon or Cachlon  (born 1946 or 1947) is an Israeli hermit who created the Hermit House in Herzliya.

Hermit house 

After living in his self-built cave-house on Sidna Ali Beach in Apollonia National Park since 1974, Kahlon was ordered to leave by the Israeli Ministry of Environmental Protection. According to Kahlon, the Ministry claim his house is dangerous to the stability of the cliff into which it is built.

His home has a well, no electricity, and no telephone. It is constructed using discarded materials.

In popular culture 
Kahlon was the subject of the documentary Appollonian Story, directed by Ilan Moskovitch and Dan Bronfeld.

Personal life 
Kahlon was aged 67 in 2014. Kahlon is divorced and is the father of three children, including a son who was 18 years old in 2014. He is Jewish.

See also 

 Vernacular architecture

References

External links 

 Appollonian Story (documentary) - official website

Living people
1940s births
Hermits
People from Herzliya